Thomas Scott Nowlin is an American screenwriter. He is known for writing the screenplays such as Maze Runner film series, Pacific Rim: Uprising and The Adam Project.

Early life and career 
Nowlin went to Florida State University.

Nowlin wrote his debut screenplay in 2014 of a science fiction action film The Maze Runner, which was directed by Wes Ball. He also wrote the script of its sequel film Maze Runner: The Scorch Trials, released in 2015, and Maze Runner: The Death Cure, the final installment of the trilogy.

Nowlin also co-wrote the screenplay and story for the film Pacific Rim: Uprising, with director Steven S. DeKnight.

Future projects 
In 2010, it was reported that Nowlin had written a spec script Columbus about Christopher Columbus, which was bought by Relativity Media with McG attached to direct the film. He also wrote a western thriller spec Wild Guns which he sold to Warner Bros. in April 2011, Gianni Nunnari would produce the film through Hollywood Gang Productions.

In April 2012, it was reported that Universal Pictures had bought the distribution rights to Agent 13, an adaptation of comic book Agent 13: The Midnight Avenger, adapted by Nowlin with Charlize Theron attached to star and Rupert Wyatt to direct. Later in July 2012, 20th Century Fox hired Ball and Nowlin to co-write the script of feature live-action adaptation of Ball's animated short film Ruin, which Ball would also direct. In October 2012, Nowlin's spec script Our Name Is Adam was bought by producer Mary Parent with attaching Tom Cruise to play the lead role. The film was later renamed to The Adam Project and has Ryan Reynolds co-starring with Jennifer Garner, with a slated release for March 11, 2022.

Filmography

References

External links 
 

Living people
21st-century American male writers
21st-century American screenwriters
American male screenwriters
Florida State University alumni
Year of birth missing (living people)